Francisco Lopez de Villalobos (1473–1549) was a Jewish converso, physician and author in the 15th century. Villalobos is credited with one of the earliest descriptions of syphilis. He has been considered part of the School of Salamanca.

Francisco descended from a long line of physicians; his father, grandfather and several ancestors before him serving Spanish nobility, including King Fernando, the Duke of Alba, the Queen of Aragon and Emperor Charles V.

References 

1473 births
1549 deaths
16th-century Spanish physicians
16th-century Jewish physicians
School of Salamanca